West Hoathly SSSI is a  geological Site of Special Scientific Interest in Sharpthorne in West Sussex. It is a Geological Conservation Review site.

Description
This working quarry exposes clays of the Wadhurst Clay Formation, which is part of the Wealden Group, dating to the Early Cretaceous between 140 and 100 million years ago. The site lies close to a postulated gap in the London-Brabant Massif through which the Boreal Sea is thought to have periodically flowed, and it is described by Natural England as "important for interpreting environmental conditions at the northwestern extremity of the Wadhurst Clay outcrop".

The site is private land with no public access.

References

External links

Sites of Special Scientific Interest in West Sussex
Geological Conservation Review sites